The Serebryanka is a river in Moscow Oblast, Russia, a tributary of the Ucha. It flows through Pushkinsky District. 
The river starts in the village of Stepankovo and ends in Pushkino city, where it is confined by a levee near its mouth. There is a boat station on the river that holds rowing competitions. The total length of the river is 13 km.

References

Rivers of Moscow Oblast
Rivers of Moscow